America's Next Great Restaurant is an NBC reality television show featuring contestants pitching restaurant ideas to a panel of judges, where the winner receives financial backing for their restaurant concept. Three locations were opened across the nation — Los Angeles, Minneapolis, and New York—on Monday, May 2, 2011, the day after the May 1 season finale. The judges included chefs Curtis Stone, Bobby Flay, Lorena Garcia, and Chipotle Mexican Grill founder Steve Ells, who were the investors in the winning concept. The production company behind the show was Magical Elves, the same company that produces Top Chef. The show, which has been described as a cross between The Apprentice and Top Chef, premiered on March 6, 2011. The first-season finale aired on Sunday, May 1, 2011, with Jamawn Woods' concept, a soul food restaurant concept called Soul Daddy, judged the winner.

The season finale, which drew a 2.0 viewership rating, was rebroadcast on May 6, as viewers in the Pacific Time Zone did not learn the winner during the original broadcast, due to the breaking news of the death of Osama bin Laden.

Due to low ratings, on May 13, 2011, NBC cancelled the show after the first season.

The three Soul Daddy restaurants that were opened (in Minneapolis, Manhattan and Los Angeles) closed within two months of their May 2, 2011 grand opening.

Contestants

Episode elimination chart

 Episode 7 was an unaired episode that had contestants create a mini-website.

 The contestant was the winner of America's Next Great Restaurant and won three restaurants in three cities across the country.
 The contestant(s) were the runners-up of America's Next Great Restaurant.
 The contestant won the challenge for the week.
 The contestant made it into the Top 10.
 The contestant was safe from elimination but did not win the challenge of the week.
 The contestant was in the bottom group for the week.
 The contestant was eliminated.

Episodes
Each episode combines a business challenge with a food challenge.

Opened restaurants
ANGR Holdings is the company that ran Soul Daddy's restaurants. It also holds registered trademarks on several of the other restaurant concepts' names (marked ® in the first table above). The Minneapolis Soul Daddy was housed in the Mall of America, while the Manhattan location was at the South Street Seaport, at 189 Front Street. The Los Angeles restaurant was located at Hollywood and Highland, in the same grand center as the Kodak Theatre. On June 14, 2011, the Manhattan and Los Angeles locations were closed in order for Woods to focus on the Minneapolis location, which itself closed on June 28. Woods was vocal in blaming Chipotle's management team for the failure of the chain, and said that the company owed him a year's salary. He reached a settlement with Chipotle by September 27 of that year.

As of early October 2011 the top three contestants were all working on opening restaurants based on their Next Great Restaurant concepts. While on leave from his job at Chrysler, Woods split his time constructing a Soul Daddy in his hometown of Detroit, while catering from his home and pursuing an associate's degree at Schoolcraft College, a school in Livonia, Michigan known for its culinary arts program. Runner-up Joey Galluzzi intended to pursue his restaurant concept, and enrolled in the Culinary Arts program at Le Cordon Bleu to improve his knowledge of the business. Runner-up Sudhir Kandula joined a San Francisco-based start-up called . as their vice president of sales, advised a friend on his software/food venture called GlassCart, and worked with friends on a stealth food project called American Dirt.

Of all of the contestants, Galluzzi was the only contestant that had successfully opened a restaurant based on his original concept and that business had operated continuously for more than five years.

References

External links

Official site

Meltworks Official website of one of the competitors.

2011 American television series debuts
2011 American television series endings
2010s American reality television series
NBC original programming
English-language television shows
Television series by Magical Elves
Reality competition television series